The list of ship launches in 1789 includes a chronological list of some ships launched in 1789.


References

1789
Ship launches